Kemp, Inc. was founded in 2000 in Bethpage, New York and operates in the application delivery controller industry. The company builds load balancing products which balances user traffic between multiple application servers in a physical, virtual or cloud environment.

In 2010, Kemp opened a European headquarters in Limerick, Ireland. Edison Ventures, Kennet Partners and ORIX Venture Finance invested $16 million into the company for research and development, sales and marketing in early 2012. In April 2014, Kemp announced a further investment in its Limerick Operations to expand from 30 positions to 80. Kemp was recognized as a Visionary in the 2015 Gartner Magic Quadrant for Application Delivery controllers and again in 2016.

In 2019, Kemp was acquired by private equity firm Mill Point Capital.

In November 2021, Kemp was acquired by Progress Software for $258 million.

Business

Kemp is a software company that develops load balancing and application delivery software built on a bespoke Linux operating system which is sold under the LoadMaster brand. As of 2019, there were over 100,000 deployments of LoadMaster globally for customers that need high availability, scalability, security and visibility for their applications. This enables customers to scale their operations by delivering applications in a highly available manner with layer 4 to 7 load balancing, enhanced performance, and greater security. LoadMaster is available as a hardware appliance as well as a software-based load balancer that is available as a virtualized appliance and in the cloud including Microsoft Azure, Amazon AWS, and other private clouds.

Products

Kemp LoadMaster
Kemp's main product, the LoadMaster, is a load balancer built on its own proprietary software platform called LMOS, that enables it to run on almost any platform: As a Kemp LoadMaster appliance, a Virtual LoadMaster (VLM) deployed on Hyper-V, VMware, on bare metal or in the public cloud. KEMP is available in Azure, where it is in the top 15 deployed applications as well as in AWS and VMware vCloud Air.

Latest version of LMOS is 7.2.54.0, released April 2021.

In 2013, Kemp announced that it was adding Pre-Authorization, Single Sign-On (SSO) and Persistent Logging to its product range as a TMG alternative

Geo Multi-Site DNS Load Balancer 
Kemp's DNS based Global Site Load Balancer (GSLB) enables customers to provide availability, scaling and resilience for applications that are geographically distributed, including data center environments, private clouds, multi-public cloud environments such as Azure and AWS as well as hybrid environments where applications are deployed across both public and private cloud. The capabilities provided by GEO LoadMaster are similar to hosted services such as Dyn DNS

VLM For Azure and AWS 
In March 2014, Kemp announced availability on the Microsoft Azure Cloud platform (the first 3rd party load balancer available) of the VLM for Azure LoadMaster, a virtual load balancer.

Kemp 360 Central™
In May 2016, Kemp launched its centralized application monitoring and reporting product, called Kemp 360 Central™, which allows network and application administrators to view the state of different load balancers or application delivery controllers. Views include throughput, users and transactions per second. The product allows users to connect to 3rd party devices like F5, AWS ELB, NGINX, and HAProxy.

Kemp 360 Vision™
At the same time as launching Kemp 360 Central, Kemp also announced the general release of 360 Vision, which monitors the health of applications. 360 Vision monitors patterns of application data, not just statistics, and is able to provide pre-emptive health alerts designed to prevent application outages.

Free LoadMaster
In March 2015, Kemp launched a free version of LoadMaster software called Free LoadMaster, which is a fully featured load balancer that shares most of the commercial product's features, including full layer 4 to layer 7 load balancing, reverse proxy, web content caching and compression, a non-commercial WAF (Web Application Firewall) and up to 20Mbit/s throughput.

SDN
Kemp announced and launched the world's first software defined network (SDN) ready adaptive load balancer and in September 2014, Kemp announced it was joining the OpenDaylight Open Source SDN Project.

Service Mesh
Kemp introduced service mesh as part of its offering in 2018 and was listed as a company to watch by TechTarget.

Notes

External links 
 

Progress Software
2000 software
DDoS mitigation companies
Defunct software companies of the United States
Networking companies of the United States
Networking hardware
Networking hardware companies
Networking software companies
Private equity portfolio companies
Server hardware